Pterin-4-alpha-carbinolamine dehydratase 2 is an enzyme that in humans is encoded by the PCBD2 gene.

References

Further reading